Belfius Bank and Insurance, known as Dexia Bank Belgium up until 1 March 2012, is a for-profit PLC founded to meet local authority needs. Belfius emerged from the dismantling of the Dexia group, of which it was part until 10 October 2011, when it was purchased by the Belgian State for 4 billion euros. The company's headquarters are in Brussels.

History

Belgium: Gemeentekrediet van België / Crédit Communal de Belgique 

Gemeentekrediet van België / Crédit Communal de Belgique is founded in 1860, specifically for the financing of local authority investments. Municipalities seeking to borrow are obliged to purchase shares equal in value to at least 5% of the borrowings. In 1947, the bank begins to develop a network of retail branches that allows funds to be drawn from the general public through savings accounts. From 1960 on, the branches are run by independent agents, allowing the offer of a broader range of services and products and the development of a lasting relationship with clients.

The international expansion of the bank starts in 1990, with the creation of the Cregem International Bank, specialising in the management of large sums of money, in the Grand Duchy of Luxembourg.

In 1990, Gemeentekrediet builds on its international expansion by taking a 25% stake in the Banque Internationale à Luxembourg (BIL), the biggest bank in Luxembourg. In early 1992, the firm increases its stake in BIL to 51%.

Belgium: BACOB / Artesia 
The Coopération Ouvrière Belge (COB), the precursor of Banque BACOB and Les AP, is founded in 1924. In 1997, BACOB bank takes the majority stakeholding in Banque Paribas Belgium, which then becomes Artesia Bank. The new group – comprising retail bank (BACOB), insurance company (Les AP), investment bank (Banque Artesia) and asset manager (Cordius), takes the name Artesia Banking Corporation in 1999.

Dexia: Group 
In 1996, Gemeentekrediet / Credit Communal de Belgique (presided over by François Narmon) merges with Crédit Local de France to form Dexia. In 1997, Dexia takes a 40% stake in Crediop, Italy’s biggest privately owned bank, specialising in finance for local administrations. Dexia increases its shareholding in Crediop to 60% in 1998.

The first listing of Dexia Group as a dual-listed company on the Paris stock exchanges dates from November 1999, at a price of €6.86 per share. In Belgium, the stock becomes part of the BEL20 index, and in France of the CAC 40. The group broadens its insurance activities in France, Belgium and Germany.

In 2000, the bank acquires Financial Security Assurance (FSA) in the United States, a major player in credit enhancement for municipalities, making Dexia the world leader in the marketing of financial services to the public sector. Dexia is active in nearly all European countries in this market as well. This marks the start of an annual reserved capital injection to which only Dexia members of staff can subscribe.

In 2001, Dexia acquires Artesia Banking Corporation, a banking group active in retail banking (BACOB), insurance (LAP), investment banking (Artesia) and  asset management (Cordius). The stake in Crediop grows to 70%, and Dexia becomes main shareholder in Otzar Hashilton Hamekomi, an Israeli credit provider for local authorities. The integration of the Artesia branches in Belgium begins in 2002. The fusion between Dexia Bank and Artesia BC brings a certain number of advantages all the while meeting certain objectives: increase retail customer base from 15 to 25%, become a market leader in bancassurance, become a fully fledged participant in private banking activities, become one of the top 3 asset managers on the Belgian market and remain the leading bank in the public and non-profit sector.

Dexia acquires 99.8% of the Turkish firm Denizbank in 2006 and creates an Institutional Investment Joint Venture with Royal Bank of Canada the same year: a 50/50 Partnership called RBC Dexia Investor Services.

Recent events

Management Committee 
On 5 September 2011, Jos Clijsters, at the time adviser to the Dexia SA management committee, is appointed chairman of the management committee of Dexia Bank Belgium, replacing Stefaan Decraene, who leaves the group to assume an international post at another bank.

On 1 January 2014, Jos Clijsters left his position as Chairman of the Management Board for the position of Chairman of the Board of Directors. Marc Raisière succeeded him as Chairman of the Management Board.

Purchase by the Belgian State 
On 4 October 2011, in the wake of a series of negative news, in the space of one day customers withdrew 300 million Euros from the bank. In response to this news, the Belgian and French governments, declaring themselves guarantors of the bank, wish to split the company to save the healthy parts and isolate the toxic parts.

On 10 October 2011, the take-over of Dexia Group’s Belgian subsidiary, Dexia Bank Belgium, by the Belgian State, is announced. This is completed at a cost of EUR 3.73 billion (270 million short of 4 billion). The Belgian State also decides to take a 60.5% stake in the financial guarantee mechanism for Dexia SA (60.5% of 90 billion, i.e., 54.45 billion).

On 19 March 2012, the Dexia share exits the BEL 20.

Name 
On 1 March 2012, Dexia Bank Belgium became Belfius Bank and Insurance. The new name Belfius comprises the "Bel" of "Belgium", the "fi" of "finances" and the English pronoun "us".

See also

Belfius Art Collection

References

External links 

Financial services companies established in 1996
Banks of Belgium
Insurance companies of Belgium
Banks under direct supervision of the European Central Bank